The Annual Review of Clinical Psychology is a peer-reviewed academic journal that publishes an annual volume of review articles relevant to clinical psychology. It was established in 2005 and is published by Annual Reviews. The co-editors are Tyrone D. Cannon and Thomas Widiger. As of 2022, Journal Citation Reports gave the journal an impact factor of 22.098, ranking it first out of 130 journals in the category "Psychology, Clinical (Social Sciences)" and fourth out of 79 journals in the category "Psychology (Science)".

History
The Annual Review of Clinical Psychology was first published in 2005. Though Annual Reviews already published the Annual Review of Psychology, which included a chapter of clinical psychology in each volume, the publisher decided that the field was large enough and rapidly expanding to justify its own journal. Its founding editor  was Susan Nolen-Hoeksema. Upon Nolen-Hoeksema's death in 2013, Tyrone D. Cannon and Thomas Widiger became co-editors. Though it was initially in publication with a print volume, it is now only published electronically.

Scope and indexing
The Annual Review of Clinical Psychology defines its scope as covering significant developments in the field of 
clinical psychology. Included subfields are theory, research, and use of psychological principles for mental disorders such as substance use, mood disorders, anxiety disorders, schizophrenia, personality disorders, and cognitive disorders. Other included topics are the diagnosis and treatment of such disorders, as well as relevant social policy and legal issues. 

As of 2022, Journal Citation Reports lists the journal's impact factor as 22.098, ranking it first out of 130 journals in the category "Psychology, Clinical" and fourth out of 79 journals in the category "Psychology (Science)".  It is abstracted and indexed in Scopus, Science Citation Index Expanded, MEDLINE, EMBASE, CINAHL, PsycINFO, and Academic Search, among others.

Editorial processes
The Annual Review of Clinical Psychology is helmed by the editor or the co-editors. The editor is assisted by the editorial committee, which includes associate editors, regular members, and occasionally guest editors. Guest members participate at the invitation of the editor, and serve terms of one year. All other members of the editorial committee are appointed by the Annual Reviews board of directors and serve five-year terms. The editorial committee determines which topics should be included in each volume and solicits reviews from qualified authors. Unsolicited manuscripts are not accepted. Peer review of accepted manuscripts is undertaken by the editorial committee.

Current editorial board
As of 2022, the editorial committee consists of the two co-editors and the following members:

 Joan Rosenbaum Asarnow
 Jutta Joormann
 Vonnie McLoyd
 Michelle G. Newman
 Michael A. Sayette

References 

 

Clinical Psychology
Annual journals
Publications established in 2005
Clinical psychology journals
English-language journals
Psychotherapy journals